Thomas Frederick Horton (May 11, 1926 – July 28, 2014) was an American sprint canoer who competed in the late 1940s and the early 1950s. Competing in two Summer Olympics, he was eliminated in the heats for both events he competed (1948: K-1 1000 m, 1952: K-2 1000 m). Horton's best finish in those heats was fifth in the 1952 K-2 1000 m event.

References

Sports-reference.com profile

1926 births
2014 deaths
American male canoeists
Olympic canoeists of the United States
Canoeists at the 1948 Summer Olympics
Canoeists at the 1952 Summer Olympics